Maidencane is a common name for several plants and may refer to:

Amphicarpum, native to the eastern United States
Panicum hemitomon, native to North America